The 1905 Goldey College football team represented Goldey College (now known as Goldey–Beacom College) in the 1905 college football season as an independent. They compiled a record of 1–4.

Schedule

Notes

References

Goldey College
Goldey College football seasons
Goldey College football